Artur "Conrad" Kozłowski (17 October 1977 – 5 September 2011) was a Polish cave diver who spent his last years in Ireland.

Biography

Career
Kozłowski came to Ireland from Poznań, in Poland, in 2006 and worked as a quantity surveyor. His projects included the Aviva Stadium and Heuston Square developments in Dublin. He would later play an important role in compiling maps for Galway County Council and the National Roads Authority for the design and development of the N18 road (Now the M18 motorway).

Introduction to cave diving
When he moved to Ireland, Kozłowski was a qualified diver, with 13 warm open water dives under his belt. Shortly after his arrival he became interested in underwater cave exploration, and began learning cave diving with the Welsh cave diving instructor Martyn Farr in 2007.

He began diving in the Hell Complex, part of the Green Holes group of underwater sea caves off Doolin, County Clare and initially used the area as a training ground for his newly acquired skills. He soon began exploring and mapping undiscovered passage, and by July 2007 he had made his first significant breakthrough, making the first traverse between Hell's Kitchen and Robertson's Cave in the nearby Reef Complex.

Exploration
Kozłowski was responsible for many extensions to cave systems in both Ireland and Spain, the most notable being the extension to the Marble Arch Caves system in County Fermanagh. The discoveries make this the longest cave in Northern Ireland.

In March 2011 Kozłowski received the Kolosy award for cave exploration at the annual Polish travelling and outdoor sports conference, held in Gdynia.

Writing and public speaking
Kozłowski was a passionate advocate of exploration and diving; his blog recounted in detail his underwater adventures. His latest discoveries filled the pages of the journal Irish Speleology and Descent magazine.

He was also an engaging public speaker; his January 2011 talk at NUIG/GMIT Sub Aqua Club was well received.

Death and legacy
Kozłowski died during a cave dive in the Gort lowlands on 5 September 2011. His body was successfully recovered on 10 September 2011 after an extensive recovery effort over several days by a team including Rick Stanton and John Volanthen.

On 15 September, Kozłowski was buried in the nearby cemetery after a service at St Attracta's church, attended by gardaí, divers and members of the Irish Cave Rescue Organisation, friends, family and members of the local community.

In August 2012, in recognition of his contribution to Irish speleology, the Speleological Union of Ireland set up the Kozłowski Fund to support original cave exploration in Ireland.

In 2013, a fundraising page was set up in order to pay for a headstone for Kozłowski 's grave in Kiltartan, and for a plaque to be erected at the entrance to Pollonora 10. The plaque and headstone were engraved by a Gort-based stonemason and on 6 September 2014, marking the third anniversary of Kozłowski's death, the gravestone and plaque were unveiled to a gathering of friends and family.

References

Further reading

External links 
 Official Website
  (in Polish with English subtitles)
 

 

1977 births
2011 deaths
Cave diving explorers
Polish explorers
Polish underwater divers
Speleologists
Underwater diving deaths
Sportspeople from Greater Poland Voivodeship
Sportspeople from Poznań
Pioneering technical divers